Toss-Up is a 2004 Turkish drama film, produced, written and directed by Uğur Yücel, starring Kenan İmirzalıoğlu and Olgun Şimşek as two soldiers return home from their military service in southeastern Turkey with disabilities.

Plot
Two soldiers return home from their military service in southeastern Turkey with disabilities.  Cevher (nicknamed "the Ghost") has lost his hearing while Rıdvan (nicknamed "the Devil") has lost a leg. Both are emotionally and physically scarred and find difficulties in adjusting to normal civilian life.

Cast
 Kenan İmirzalıoğlu (Cevher) 
 Olgun Şimşek (Rıdvan) 
 Bahri Beyat (Cemil Sandalcılar / Father Cemil) 
 Engin Günaydın (Sencer) 
 Seda Akman (Nazan)
 Teoman Kumbaracıbaşı (Teoman) 
 Erkan Can (Firuz) 
 Eli Mango (Tasula) 
 Mizgin Kapazan (Şefika) 
 Levent Can (Hamit) 
 Şinasi Yurtsever (Basri) 
 Ahmet Mümtaz Taylan (Maksut Sandalcılar / Uncle Maki) 
 Ülkü Duru (Melahat) 
 Haldun Boysan (Muhittin)

Awards
The film won a record 11 awards at the 41st Antalya Golden Orange Film Festival including Best Film, Best Director, Best Actor (for Olgun Şimşek), Best Supporting Actor (for Bahri Beyat), Best Supporting Actress (for Eli Mango), Best Screenplay (for Uğur Yücel) and Best Music (for Erkan Oğur).

Reception
Toss-Up has received had positive reviews. 
Derek Elley from Variety stated in April 2005 that it "draws some fine playing from its cast" and "solid material for festival sidebars and film weeks".

References

External links
 

2004 drama films
Films set in Turkey
Films shot in Turkey
Golden Orange Award for Best Film winners
Turkish drama films
2000s Turkish-language films